Goldia is a genus of Palearctic butterfly in the family Lycaenidae. The genus is monotypic, containing the single species Goldia pacifica found in Primorye.

References

Theclini
Monotypic butterfly genera
Lycaenidae genera